The Hà Thanh River is a river of Vietnam. It flows through  Vân Canh District in Bình Định Province for 58 kilometres.

Rivers of Bình Định province
Rivers of Vietnam